"Crazy Train" is the debut solo single by English heavy metal vocalist Ozzy Osbourne and was released in 1980 from his debut album as a solo artist, Blizzard of Ozz (1980). A live version of the song recorded in 1981 from the album Tribute was also released as a single in 1987 with an accompanying music video. The song was written by Osbourne, Randy Rhoads, and Bob Daisley. The lyrics deal with the subject of the Cold War and the fear of annihilation that existed during this period.

Production and reception
Guitarist Greg Leon, who initially took Randy Rhoads's place in Quiet Riot, has claimed that he helped Rhoads write what would become the iconic "Crazy Train" riff. "We were hanging out, and I showed him the riff to Steve Miller's 'Swingtown'. I said: 'Look what happens when you speed this riff up.' We messed around, and the next thing I know he took it to a whole other level and end up writing the 'Crazy Train' riff." Guitarist William Weaver has also claimed to have written the signature riff and then presented the music to Rhoads in a studio session.

AllMusic reviewer Steve Huey described the main guitar riff as "a classic, making use of the full minor scale in a way not seen since Ritchie Blackmore's heyday with Deep Purple."

The song is one of Osbourne's best known and recognizable as a solo performer. It was rated 9th-greatest guitar solo ever by readers of Guitar World magazine. The song was also ranked ninth by VH1 on the list of the 40 Greatest Metal Songs and in 2009 it was named the 23rd-greatest hard rock song of all time also by VH1, the highest placement by a solo artist on the list. In 2021, it topped Metal Hammers readers' poll of the Top 50 Ozzy Osbourne songs, with the magazine informing that it is Osbourne's most played song, with over 1150 live performances, over 11 million plays on YouTube, and nearly 400 million on Spotify (as of December 2021).

The single reached No. 49 on the United Kingdom singles chart in 1980. In the United States, the song reached No. 9 on the Billboard Top Tracks chart and the single peaked at No. 6 on the Billboard Bubbling Under the Hot 100 chart in 1981. The master ringtone was certified double platinum and had by September 2010 sold 1,750,000 downloads. The Tribute re-release was accompanied by a music video.

Personnel
1980 studio version
 Ozzy Osbourne – lead vocals
 Randy Rhoads – guitar
 Bob Daisley – bass
 Lee Kerslake – drums, vibraslap

1987 version (originally recorded live in 1981)
 Ozzy Osbourne – vocals
 Randy Rhoads – guitar
 Rudy Sarzo – bass
 Tommy Aldridge – drums
 Don Airey – keyboards

2002 re-issue
 Ozzy Osbourne – vocals
 Randy Rhoads – guitar
 Robert Trujillo – bass
 Mike Bordin – drums
 Don Airey – keyboards

Certifications

See also
 List of train songs
 List of songs about the Cold War

References

External links
 [ Song review] at Allmusic
 "Crazy Train" lyrics on Songfacts

1980 songs
1980 debut singles
1987 singles
Ozzy Osbourne songs
Anti-war songs
Animated music videos
Protest songs
Songs written by Ozzy Osbourne
Songs written by Randy Rhoads
Songs about trains
Songs written by Bob Daisley
Epic Records singles
Jet Records singles